Singireddy Niranjan Reddy (born 4 October 1958) is an Indian politician serving as the Minister of Agriculture, Co-operation and Marketing of Telangana since 2019. He represents Wanaparthy constituency in the Telangana Legislative Assembly. He is the member of Telangana Rashtra Samithi politburo.

Early life
He was born in Wanaparthy District in Telangana to Ram Reddy, a farmer. He did his B.Sc and LLB from Osmania University.

Career
Niranjan Reddy was a practicing lawyer before joining TRS party as a founding member in 2001.

Political career
 Singireddy Niranjan Reddy contested State Legislature from Kollapur in 2004 and Wanaparthy in 2014 but lost.
 He was appointed Vice Chairman, Telangana State Planning Board in December 2014.
 He contested State Legislature from Wanaparthy in 2018 elections and won by a margin of 51,685 votes.
He was appointed cabinet minister on 19 February 2019 for agriculture, marketing, cooperation, food & civil supplies, consumer affairs.

References

Telangana politicians
Telangana Rashtra Samithi politicians
1958 births
Living people
People from Wanaparthy district
Telangana MLAs 2018–2023